The 1999 Swisscom Challenge was a women's tennis tournament played on indoor hard courts at the Schluefweg in Zurich, Switzerland that was part of Tier I of the 1999 WTA Tour. It was the 16th edition of the tournament and was held from 11 October until 17 October 1999. Second-seeded Venus Williams won the singles title.

Entrants

Seeds

Other entrants
The following players received wildcards into the singles main draw:
  Lisa Raymond
  Miriam Oremans
  Jennifer Capriati

The following players received wildcards into the doubles main draw:
  Maureen Drake /  Miroslava Vavrinec

The following players received entry from the qualifying draw:

  Tatiana Panova
  Corina Morariu
  Elena Dementieva
  Magüi Serna

  Jelena Kostanić /  Tara Snyder

The following player received entry as a lucky loser:
  Henrieta Nagyová

Finals

Singles

 Venus Williams defeated  Martina Hingis 6–3, 6–4
 It was Williams' 6th title of the year and the 9th of her career.

Doubles

 Lisa Raymond /  Rennae Stubbs defeated  Nathalie Tauziat /  Natasha Zvereva 6–2, 6–2
 It was Raymond's 3rd title of the year and the 12th of her career. It was also Stubbs' 3rd title of the year, but the 17th of her career.

External links
 WTA tournament details
 ITF tournament details

Swisscom Challenge
Zurich Open
1999 in Swiss tennis
1999 in Swiss women's sport